A Charleston single house is a form of house found in Charleston, South Carolina. A single house has its narrow side (often two- or three-bays wide) with a gable end along the street and a longer side (often five-bays) running perpendicular to the street. The house is well-suited to long, narrow lots which were laid out in early Charleston. Despite the popularity of the story, single houses were not built to avoid taxes that were, according to the tales, based on the width of the house; no evidence supports anything about such fanciful myths.

Although the form can be found across historic Charleston in a variety of styles (e.g., Federal, Greek Revival, and Victorian), the consistent feature is interior layout. A front door on the long side of the house, halfway along the side perpendicular to the street, opens onto a short central hall and staircase. There is one room on each side of the hall, that is, one toward the street and one toward the rear of the house. The result is a building which is only one room wide when viewed from the street, giving the form its popular name. Each floor contained two rooms, and the floorplan was reproduced on each upper floor.

Although not a part of the earliest single houses, later buildings had two- and three-story porches, known locally as piazzas, added. The piazzas always appear on the side of the house with the front door which, to take best advantage of local winds, will be the south or west side.

Service areas were often located in separate buildings behind the house. A single house would typically be built along one edge of a property, leaving a carriage way along the opposite side of a narrow lot. A piazza, if part of the house, would run the length of the house along the side yard which could be entered from the street. Alternatively, most single houses with piazzas have what appears to be a front door immediately on the street. However, the "front door" is in reality merely a screen between the public sidewalk and the private piazza. The actual front door for the house is located halfway along the piazza.

Gallery

References

American architectural styles
Architecture in South Carolina
History of Charleston, South Carolina
House styles